Tehzeeb is a 1971 Pakistani film. It stars Rani, Shahid, Saeed Khan Rangeela, Aslam Pervaiz and Lehri.

The makers of this film were asked to change a reference to Egypt (Misr in Urdu language) because it might prove detrimental to diplomatic relations with that country. While the line Laga hai Misr ka bazaar dekho changed to Laga hai husn ka bazaar dekho in the movie soundtrack, audio-recordings of the film song had already sold in good numbers.

Cast
 Rani
 Shahid Hameed
 Rangeela
 Aslam Pervaiz
 Lehri
 Tamanna
 Sabiha Khanum

Music
A popular song of this film was:
 "Laga Hai Husn Ka Bazaar Dekho" Sung by Mehdi Hassan and solo by Noor Jehan, lyrics by Saifuddin Saif and music by Nisar Bazmi.

Reception 
Tehzeeb was a super-hit film of 1971.

References

External links 
 

Pakistani musical drama films
1970s Urdu-language films
1971 films
Urdu-language Pakistani films